Planchonella duclitan is a species of plant in the family Sapotaceae. A tree that may attain a height of 40 meters, presenting glossy leaves and orange fruit. It is common on Christmas Island, dominating up to 20% of the upper leaf canopy, as a tree to 30 meters, in established forest or around 40% in regenerating habitat where it may attain the maximum height.

The species has been described as Planchonella nitida (Blume) Dubard, later regarded as a synonym for this treatment.
The tree is used as a nest site by Abbott's booby, a sea-bird species Papasula abbotti, and fruit and flowers provide food for the fruit bat Pteropus natalis.

References

duclitan
Flora of Christmas Island
Taxa named by Francisco Manuel Blanco
Taxa named by Reinier Cornelis Bakhuizen van den Brink (born 1911)